The kisslip himri or Kosswig's barb (Carasobarbus kosswigi) is a species of cyprinid fish of the genus Carasobarbus that is found in the Tigris-Euphrates river system in Iran and Turkey.  It was originally described as Cyclocheilichthys kosswigi.

References

 

Carasobarbus
Fish of Asia
Fish described in 1960